William Noy (1577 – 9 August 1634) was an English jurist.

He was born on the family estate of Pendrea in St Buryan, Cornwall.  He left Exeter College, Oxford, without taking a degree, and entered Lincoln's Inn in 1594. From 1603 until his death he was elected, with one exception, to each parliament, sitting invariably for a constituency of his native county. For several years his sympathies were in antagonism to the court party, yet every commission that was appointed numbered Noy among its members, and even those who were opposed to him in politics acknowledged his learning.

A few years before his death he changed political allegiance, went over to the side of the court, and in October 1631 he was created Attorney-general, but was never knighted. It was through his advice that the impost of ship money was levied, resulting in a controversy that helped trigger the English Civil War. Noy suffered from stones, and died in great pain; he was buried at New Brentford church.

His principal works are On the Grounds and Maxims of the Laws of this Kingdom (1641) and The Compleat Lawyer (1661).

References

Further reading 
 

 
 
 
 
 

 

1577 births
1634 deaths
People from St Buryan
English lawyers
Members of Lincoln's Inn
Alumni of Exeter College, Oxford
Attorneys General for England and Wales
Politicians from Cornwall
English MPs 1604–1611
English MPs 1621–1622
English MPs 1624–1625
English MPs 1626
English MPs 1628–1629
16th-century English lawyers
Burials in South East England
Members of the Parliament of England for Grampound
Members of the Parliament of England for Helston
Members of the Parliament of England for Fowey
Members of the Parliament of England for St Ives